Giuseppe Marco Zampano (born 30 September 1993) is an Italian footballer who plays as a right-back.

Career
Born in Genoa, Liguria along with his twin brother Francesco in 1993, they were youth products of Sampdoria. In 2010–11 season both left for another Ligurian team Virtus Entella in temporary deal. Francesco remained in Chiavari (where Entella is based) and Giuseppe returned to Genoa for 2011–12 season.

Zampano along with Moreno Beretta, Edoardo Blondett, Andrea Magrassi, Alessandro Martinelli and Andrea Tozzo, they were transferred to Lega Pro Prima Divisione club Portogruaro in temporary deal, on 2 August 2012. Zampano played 12 times in 2012–13 Italian third division season.

Zampano became a free agent on 1 July 2013. On 6 December 2013 he was signed by Lega Pro Seconda Divisione club Martina.

On 18 June 2014, he was signed by Serie B club Crotone on a free transfer on a 3-year contract. After having terminated the contract with the Crotone, in January 2017, he signed with Venezia team that plays in the Lega Pro.

On 5 December 2019, he signed with Serie C club Cesena until the end of the 2019–20 season.

On 24 August 2020 he joined Reggiana.

On 27 September 2021, he moved to Fidelis Andria. On 8 January 2022, he signed with Potenza.

References

External links
 AIC profile (data by football.it) 

1993 births
Footballers from Genoa
Living people
Italian footballers
U.C. Sampdoria players
Virtus Entella players
A.S.D. Portogruaro players
A.S.D. Martina Calcio 1947 players
F.C. Crotone players
Venezia F.C. players
A.C. Reggiana 1919 players
S.S. Fidelis Andria 1928 players
Potenza Calcio players
Serie C players
Serie B players
Association football midfielders